Matt Hilder (born 30 April 1982) is an Australian former professional rugby league footballer who played in the 2000s and 2010s. He played for the Cronulla-Sutherland Sharks, Gold Coast and Newcastle Knights in the National Rugby League. Throughout his playing career he was known by two nicknames: Trouble, and Waltzing (as in "Waltzing Matilda").

Background
Hilder was born in Sutherland, New South Wales, Australia.  He played his junior football for the Cronulla-Caringbah before being signed by Cronulla-Sutherland.

Playing career

Cronulla-Sutherland Sharks
In round 1 of the 2003 NRL season, Hilder made his NRL debut for Cronulla-Sutherland against the Melbourne Storm scoring a try in a 32-36 loss.  In his four years at Cronulla, Hilder played in one finals campaign which came in the 2005 NRL season.  Cronulla were eliminated in the first week by rivals St George.

Gold Coast Titans
After four seasons of first-grade with Cronulla, Hilder joined the Gold Coast Titans for their inaugural season, signing a 1-year contract starting in 2007. He was a regular in first-grade, but left the club at the end of the season.

Newcastle Knights

In 2008, Hilder joined the Newcastle Knights.

In 2010, Hilder won the Knights' Player of the Year award for being one of the most hardworking and consistent players in the team.

On 6 September 2013, Hilder re-signed with the Knights on a 1-year contract.

A few days after re-signing, Hilder made a return to first-grade — after being seldom used by Knights coach Wayne Bennett since early 2012 — in time to play all three of the Knights' finals games and scoring a try in his 100th Knights game and 200th NRL game against the Melbourne Storm. These were the final few first-grade games of his career.

At the end of 2013, Hilder won the Knights' New South Wales Cup Players' Player award.

In September 2014, Hilder announced his retirement from rugby league, finishing up with 201 NRL appearances.

Representative football
In July 2013, Hilder played for the New South Wales Residents against the Queensland Residents.

Controversy
On 10 September 2006, Hilder threw a plastic chair at a man during an argument, causing head injuries. Hilder was fined $1,000.

Personal life
Hilder has a wife, Natalie and three children: two daughters, Indy and Eden, and a son, Sunny.

References

External links
2014 Newcastle Knights profile

1982 births
Australian rugby league players
Cronulla-Sutherland Sharks players
Gold Coast Titans players
Newcastle Knights players
Macquarie Scorpions players
Rugby league locks
Rugby league hookers
Rugby league five-eighths
Living people
Rugby league players from Sydney